South East Poinsettias is the name of the southeast division of the Queensland Rugby League. They run competitions such as "The Mixwell Cup," which is the division below the Queensland Cup, and "The Mixwell Colts."

Brothers-Valleys participated until the end of the 2004, with Hills District Panthers and the Tugun Seahawks entering.

External links
South East Poinsettias

Queensland Rugby League
Rugby league governing bodies in Australia
Rugby league in Queensland
Rugby league competitions in Queensland